Rumor Has It is the fourth studio album by American country music singer Clay Walker. It was released April 8, 1997, on Giant Records. The album was certified platinum by the RIAA and reached #32 on the Billboard album charts. Singles released from it include the title track, "One, Two, I Love You", "Watch This", and "Then What?", which respectively reached #1, #18, #4, and #2 on the Hot Country Songs charts between 1997 and 1998.

Background
In an interview with The Spokesman Review Walker stated "I wanted this album to be even more country. I felt the sounds on the records were beginning to get a little stock and sounded, to me anyway, predictable. I felt it needed to get back to a much more rural sound, like we had on my first album."

"Rumor Has It" was the first album Walker released after being diagnosed with multiple sclerosis. During an interview with CMT he stated, "The most important thing that I have learned is there are two things that really matter. The fans are personable, and they're not just a number. They really care about who you are. Like when I was diagnosed with MS, I saw a different side of country music than I ever realized was there. I thought it all was just a business. It's not that way at all. It's a family. Secondly, I learned that hit records are what makes the career. You have to have those hit records, and you have to find the best songs out there. Those are the two most important things -- be loyal to the fans because they're loyal to you, and to put out hit records. It's really that simple, and you can't have one without the other I don't think." Walker also said, "For me, I still feel like a newcomer. I think I'm just now starting to put out my best work; or I'm getting ready to. I've had a lot of experience with James Stroud in the studio, which makes me more comfortable in the studio. So album wise, I feel like I'm growing a lot."

Track listing

Critical reception

Mikel Toombs of The San Diego Union-Tribune gave the album a negative review writing, "An overactive arrangement and a mess of vocal mannerisms fail to hide the song's mundane nature. And Walker's singing also doesn't benefit "Country Boy and City Girl," a failed attempt at a Randy Travis weeper, although the utterly clichéd lyrics are even more deadly. To be fair, Walker is adept at snappy, sappy fare like "I'd Say That's Right" and "Heart Over Head Over Heels". But most of this CD's value remains in the foldout miniposter that backs the packaging." Buffalo News gave the album two stars and wrote, "I wish the man well, but his music just leaves me cold. Yes, he occasionally turns out a clever song like "One, Two, I Love You" from this set, but the man consistently does the unforgivable—he sings without soul." The Dallas Morning News gave the album a negative review writing the album "is Mr. Walker's poorest effort to date. Opening with the instantly forgettable title cut and closing with Then What, a watered-down attempt at Jimmy Buffett-inspired calypso, Rumor Has It finds Mr. Walker abandoning all the promise that spurred his 1993 debut album for empty-headed mainstream pop.

Mike Joyce of the Washington Post gave the album a negative review by writing, "Walker's vocal talent isn't nearly impressive enough to overcome the hackneyed songwriting that keeps surfacing throughout the album." Paul Verna of Billboard said, "As one of the spiritual children of the George Jones school of hard-edged Southwestern country, he maintains the tradition of kick-ass up-tempo songs and solemn, hat-in-hand ballads. The world may not need another margarita song, but the one here is OK." Thom Owens of AllMusic wrote, "Rumor Has It may not be among his very best, yet there are enough strong moments to make it worthwhile for most fans." Larry Stephens of Country Standard Time gave the album a negative review and said, "Most of this is cookie cutter country, and Walker's voice doesn't add anything to the mix - it's just one of dozens that all sound the same." Marianne Horner of Country Spotlight gave the album a favorable review and wrote, "Rumor Has It presents Clay Walker in the basic, pure country style that kicked opened the doors for him four years ago, and made him a major force in country music today."

Personnel
Eddie Bayers – drums
Bruce Bouton – steel guitar
Larry Byrom – acoustic guitar
Dan Dugmore – steel guitar
Stuart Duncan – fiddle
Paul Franklin – steel guitar
Tim Mensy – acoustic guitar
Steve Nathan – piano
Tom Roady – percussion, steel drums
Brent Rowan – electric guitar, acoustic guitar
Tim Sargeant – steel guitar
Joe Spivey – fiddle
Wayne Toups – squeeze box
Clay Walker – lead vocals
Glenn Worf – bass guitar
Curtis Wright – background vocals
Curtis Young – background vocals

Chart performance
During the album's debut week, it sold over 30,000 units.

Weekly charts

Year-end charts

Certifications

References

1997 albums
Giant Records (Warner) albums
Clay Walker albums
Albums produced by James Stroud